Oh, You Crazy Moon or Oh! You Crazy Moon is a traditional pop song by Jimmy Van Heusen, with lyrics by Johnny Burke. It was recorded by Tommy Dorsey in 1939, with at least six other recorded versions following Dorsey's in 1939. It was recorded by Mel Tormé in 1960 and Frank Sinatra in 1965.

Recordings
 Mel Tormé - Swingin' on the Moon (1960)
 Stan Kenton - The Romantic Approach (1961)
 Sarah Vaughan - Snowbound (1963)
 Tony Bennett - When Lights Are Low (1964)
 Wes Montgomery - California Dreaming (1966), Willow Weep for Me (1969)
 Frank Sinatra - Moonlight Sinatra (1966)
 Peggy Lee - Extra Special! (1967)
 Mel Tormé and George Shearing - An Elegant Evening (1985)
 Trio Désolé featuring Lorraine Caron on the album Sweet Surrender (2013)

References

Songs with music by Jimmy Van Heusen
Songs with lyrics by Johnny Burke (lyricist)
1960 songs
Songs about the Moon